Mueller College is a coeducational independent Christian school located in Rothwell, a suburb within the Moreton Bay Region in Queensland, Australia. The college was established in 1990 as a ministry of the Mueller Community Church, which is a member church of Christian Community Churches of Australia that also operates an Early Learning Centre, Bible College, Retirement Village and Aged Care Facility. The Mueller community is named in reference to George Müller, a Christian evangelist who established 117 schools and offered Christian education to more than 120,000 students.

Mueller College's role of Head of College is currently held by Paul Valese. The college also consists of one Deputy Head of College, one Head of Primary, one Head of Secondary, four School Coordinators, two Heads of Teaching & Learning and one Head of Research & Innovation.

In August 2018, Mueller College had a total enrolment population of 1575 students from Preparatory to Year 12.

Curriculum

Preparatory

Preparatory students enrolled at Mueller College engage in various literacy and numeracy activities as well as fundamental Christian studies. Each student is introduced to the specialist subjects of Art, Chinese, Music and Physical Education, which continue throughout the Primary School phase.

Primary school

Mueller College's Primary School curriculum consists of the subjects of English, Mathematics, Art, Biblical Studies, Chinese, History, LEM Phonics, Music, Physical Education and Science.

Middle school

Students in Years 7 and 8 engage in English, Mathematics, Geography, Health & Physical Education, History and Science courses that are written in line with Australian Curriculum requirements. In Year 9, students undertake the compulsory core subjects of English (General or Essential English), Mathematics (Advanced & Mainstream Mathematics or Essential Mathematics), Christian Studies, Health & Physical Education, History and Science. Each student also undertakes three of the elective subjects of Extension English, Extension Science, Humanities (Business & Economics, Chinese, Geography and Practical Business Applications), Physical Education, Technology (Design, Digital Solutions, Food Technology, Industrial Technology, STEM and Textiles & Fashion) and the Arts (Dance, Drama, Music, Visual Art and Film, Television & New Media).

Senior School

Year 10

Students in Year 10 undertake the compulsory core subjects of English (General or Essential English), Mathematics (Essential Mathematics, General Mathematics or Mathematical Methods) and Global Perspectives. Each student also undertakes four of the elective subjects of Extension English, Extension Mathematics, Humanities (Business & Accounting, Chinese, Geography, History, Legal & Justice Studies, Philosophy & Reason and Practical Business Applications), Science (Biology, Chemistry, Essential Science, Physics and Psychology), Physical Education & Practical Arts (Fashion, Food & Nutrition and Physical Education), Technology (Aerospace/STEM, Design, Digital Solutions and Industrial Technology) and the Arts (Dance, Drama, Music, Visual Art and Film, Television & New Media).

Years 11–12

Mueller College offers a range of General subjects, Applied subjects and Vocational Education & Training (VET) courses to students in Years 11 and 12.

General subjects available include:

 Arts
 Dance
 Drama
 Film, Television & New Media
 Music
 Visual Art
 English
 General English
 English as an Additional Language
 Literature
 Health & Physical Education
 Physical Education
 Humanities
 Accounting
 Ancient History
 Business
 Chinese
 Geography
 Legal Studies
 Modern History
 Philosophy & Reason
 Mathematics
 General Mathematics
 Mathematical Methods
 Specialist Mathematics
 Science
 Biology
 Chemistry
 Physics
 Psychology
 Technologies
 Aerospace Systems
 Design
 Digital Solutions
 Food & Nutrition

Applied subjects available to students include Arts in Practice, Essential English, Essential Mathematics, Fashion, Industrial Graphics Skills, Industrial Technology Skills, Science in Practice, Sport & Recreation - Outdoor Education and Sport & Recreation - Sports & Fitness.

VET courses available to students include:
 Certificate II in Skills for Work and Vocational Pathways (FSK20113)
 Certificate III in Business (BSB30115)
 Certificate III in Hospitality (SIT30616)/Certificate III in Events (SIT30516)

Extracurricular activities

Extracurricular activities available to students at Mueller College include:
 The MUROC Radio Controlled Plane Club, in which students learn how to design, build, fly and maintain model aircraft
 The Infinity Program for academically advanced students
 Mission trips through Australian Mission Outreach Support (AMOS)
 Vella & Apphia development programs for students in Years 7–10
 Music tours

References

External links

 

Nondenominational Christian schools in Queensland
Private schools in Queensland
Schools in South East Queensland
Rothwell, Queensland
Educational institutions established in 1990
1990 establishments in Australia
Buildings and structures in Moreton Bay Region